Micronychia is a genus of flowering plants in the family Anacardiaceae, with all species endemic to Madagascar, usually on the eastern side of the island.

Species
The following species are accepted:
Micronychia acuminata 
Micronychia bemangidiensis 
Micronychia benono 
Micronychia danguyana 
Micronychia kotozafii 
Micronychia macrophylla 
Micronychia madagascariensis 
Micronychia minutiflora 
Micronychia striata 
Micronychia tsiramiramy

References

Anacardiaceae
Anacardiaceae genera
Endemic flora of Madagascar